Path (stylized as PATH) is a network of underground pedestrian tunnels, elevated walkways, and at-grade walkways connecting the office towers of Downtown Toronto, Ontario, Canada. It connects more than 70 buildings via  of tunnels, walkways, and shopping areas. As of 2016, over 200,000 residents and workers use the Path system daily with the number of private dwellings within walking distance at 30,115.

The Path network's northern point is the Atrium on Bay at Dundas Street and Bay Street, including a now-closed tunnel to the former Toronto Coach Terminal, while its southern point is Waterpark Place on Queens Quay. Its main north–south axes of walkways generally parallel Yonge and Bay Streets, while its main east–west axis parallels King Street.

There is continuous expansion of the Path system around Union Station. Two towers being built as part of CIBC Square will be linked to the Path system, extending it to the east to cross over Yonge Street by a pedestrian bridge into the Backstage Condominium building (Esplanade and Yonge corner), giving closed access to Union Station, Scotiabank Arena, and other buildings in Toronto's Financial District.

History

Early pedestrian tunnels

In 1900, the Eaton's department store constructed a tunnel underneath James Street, allowing shoppers to walk between the Eaton's main store at Yonge and Queen streets and the Eaton's Annex located behind the (then) City Hall. It was the first underground pedestrian pathway in Toronto and is often credited as a historic precursor to the current Path network. The original Eaton's tunnel is still in use as part of the Path system, although today it connects Toronto Eaton Centre to the Bell Trinity Square office complex on the site of the former Annex building.

Another original underground linkage, built in 1927 to connect Union Station and the Royal York Hotel, remained an integral part of the Path network for many years until it was replaced by a newer connection between the Royal York Hotel and Royal Bank Plaza, which continues onward to Union Station.

Expansion

The network of underground walkways expanded under city planner Matthew Lawson in the 1960s. Toronto's downtown sidewalks were overcrowded, and new office towers were removing the much-needed small businesses from the streets. Lawson thus convinced several important developers to construct underground malls, pledging that they would eventually be linked. The designers of the Toronto-Dominion Centre, the first of Toronto's major urban developments in the 1960s (completed in 1967), were the first to include underground shopping in their complex, with the possibility of future expansion built in. The city originally helped fund the construction, but with the election of a reform city council, this practice ended. The reformers disliked the underground system, agreeing with Jane Jacobs's notion that an active street life was important in keeping cities and neighbourhoods vital and that consumers should be encouraged to shop on street level stores rather than in malls (whether they be above ground or below); however, the system continued to grow, as developers bowed to their tenants' wishes and connected their buildings to the system. This also converted low-valued basements into some of the most valuable retail space in the country.

The next expansion of the network occurred in the early 1970s with the construction and underground connection of the Richmond-Adelaide Centre office tower with the Sheraton Centre hotel complex.

21st century

Construction of the Path tunnel north from Scotia Plaza through the Bay Adelaide Centre started in the fourth quarter of 2007. Completion of this section closed the last remaining gap in the north–south route through Path that parallels Yonge Street, thus eliminating the need to double back from Bay Street to get between buildings located on the eastern edge of Path.

In 2011, the City of Toronto released a long-term expansion plan for the Path network, developed by Urban Strategies Inc. As part of the expansion plan, there will be 45 new entry points, and the walkway expanded to as long as  when changes are completed.

In August 2014, a major southward expansion of the Path network brought it closer to the Toronto waterfront, with the opening of a covered pedestrian bridge connecting Scotiabank Arena south to RBC WaterPark Place on Queens Quay (crossing the Lake Shore Boulevard / Gardiner Expressway corridor and Harbour Street).

Toronto planners have begun work to guide future Path development and ensure Path link construction is included in basement levels of key new buildings.

The network was particularly hard-hit during the COVID-19 pandemic in Toronto, with Bloomberg News calling the area a "ghost town". The pedestrian system's narrow halls in some locations were noted as a particular challenge, even once downtown employees returned to the office. The Toronto Financial District Business Improvement Area has planned various movement modifications to the space for future use.

In early November 2020, a connection was opened between the Maple Leaf Square complex (via the basement-level Longo's supermarket) and ÏCE Condominiums at York Centre. On December 5, 2020, the new Union Station Bus Terminal was opened within the new CIBC Square complex and connected via a skywalk to the Scotiabank Arena.

Design
Path provides an important contribution to the economic viability of the city's downtown core and is also used to supplement sidewalk capacity in downtown Toronto. The system facilitates pedestrian linkages to public transit, accommodating more than 200,000 daily commuters and thousands of additional tourists and residents en route to sports and cultural events. Its underground nature provides pedestrians with a safe haven from the winter cold and snow, as well as relief from the summer heat and humidity.

Coordination and signage

In 1987, City Council adopted a unified wayfinding system throughout the network. The design firms Gottschalk+Ash International and Muller Design Associates were hired to design and implement the overall system in consultation with a diverse group of land owners, City staff and stakeholders. A colour-coded system with directional cues was deployed in the early 1990s. Within the various buildings, pedestrians can find a Path system map, plus cardinal directions (P (red) for south, A (orange) for west, T (blue) for north, H (yellow) for east) on ceiling signs at selected junctions.

The signage can be hard to find inside some of the various connected buildings. Building owners concerned about losing customers to neighbouring buildings insisted any signage not dominate their buildings or their own signage system. The city relented and the result is the current system. Many complain the system is hard to navigate.

Connected facilities
More than 50 buildings or office towers are connected through the Path system. It comprises twenty parking garages, five subway stations, two major department stores, two major shopping centres, six major hotels, and a railway terminal. The CN Tower, Ripley's Aquarium of Canada, and Rogers Centre are connected via an enclosed elevated walkway, called the SkyWalk, from Union Station, although the walkway does not have indoor connections to these attractions.

1 King Street West
1 Queen Street East
1 York
10 Dundas East
150 York
2 Queen Street East
19 Grand Trunk
22 Front Street West
25 Lower Simcoe
55 University
Atrium on Bay
Bay Adelaide Centre
Bell Trinity Square
Brookfield Place
Canadian Broadcasting Centre
CIBC Square
Citibank Place
Commerce Court
 Delta Marriott Hotel
Design Exchange
Dundee Place
Exchange Tower
EY Tower
Federal Building
First Canadian Place
Four Seasons Centre
Hilton Hotel
Hockey Hall of Fame
HSBC Bank of Canada Building
Hudson's Bay Queen Street
ÏCE Condominiums at York Centre
ING Tower
Maple Leaf Square
MetLife Place
Metro Hall
Metro Toronto Convention Centre
Munich Re Centre
Richmond-Adelaide Centre
Ritz-Carlton Toronto
RBC Centre
Roy Thomson Hall
Royal Bank Plaza
Fairmont Royal York
Scotia Plaza
Scotiabank Arena
Sheraton Centre Toronto Hotel
Simcoe Place
Southcore Financial Centre
Sun Life Centre
Telus Tower
Thomson Building
Toronto City Hall
Toronto-Dominion Centre
Toronto Eaton Centre
Toronto Coach Terminal
Toronto subway stations:
Dundas station
Queen station
King station
Union station
St. Andrew station
Osgoode station
Union Station
Union Station Bus Terminal
Victory Building
Yonge–Dundas Square
Yonge–Richmond Centre

References

External links

Official PATH map (PDF)
 Online Directory of the PATH

 
Shopping malls in Toronto
Pedways in Canada
Underground cities
Pedestrian tunnels